Ólafur Gíslason (born 16 November 1936) is an Icelandic footballer. He played in two matches for the Iceland national football team from 1956 to 1957.

References

External links
 

1936 births
Living people
Olafur Gislason
Olafur Gislason
Place of birth missing (living people)
Association footballers not categorized by position